The Whitney and Gray Building is an historic building in Portland, Oregon. It houses the restaurant Jake's Famous Crawfish and is listed on the National Register of Historic Places.

The building that has housed the restaurant since 1911 was added to the U.S. National Register of Historic Places in 1983, as the Whitney & Gray Building and Jake's Famous Crawfish Restaurant.

See also
 National Register of Historic Places listings in South and Southwest Portland, Oregon

References

External links
 

Buildings and structures in Portland, Oregon
National Register of Historic Places in Portland, Oregon
Southwest Portland, Oregon